Dil Kumari (Nepali: दिल कुमारी) is a Nepali politician and a member of the House of Representatives of the federal parliament of Nepal. She is also a member of the House Industry, Commerce, Labour and Consumer Interest Committee. She is a member of Nepal Communist Party (NCP).

References

Living people
21st-century Nepalese women politicians
21st-century Nepalese politicians
Nepal MPs 2017–2022
Nepal Communist Party (NCP) politicians
Communist Party of Nepal (Maoist Centre) politicians
1973 births